Boilo is a traditional Christmas or Yuletide drink in the Coal Region of northeastern and east central Pennsylvania.

Boilo is a variation of a traditional Lithuanian liqueur called "Krupnik", or "Krupnikas".

Characteristically boilo has a standard recipe including citrus fruits (such as oranges and lemons), herbs and spices (such as nutmeg, cloves, caraway seed, and anise seed), and other ingredients such as honey and ginger ale.  The traditional base ingredient in boilo is moonshine. Many modern recipes have replaced home-brewed moonshine with blended whiskey, rye or grain alcohol, and may be made on a stove top or in a slow cooker.  Some recipes specify Four Queens, a blended whiskey originally bottled in Philadelphia by Kasser Liquors and later sold to Laird & Company in New Jersey. 
Variations on the traditional recipe include honeyberry boilo, "tomata" boilo, blueberry boilo, and apple pie boilo. Some traditions recommend that holiday music and decorating accompany the cooking process, to add to the festive effect of the beverage.

As with krupnik, some believe it to have curative properties for the onset of fall/winter related ailments such as a cold or influenza.

There are many boilo taste test contests held annually in the Coal Region of Pennsylvania where home brewers compete over whose recipe is most authentic and whose boilo is the most easy drinking. The Annual Pfeiffenberger Boilo Contest is among the most prestigious and intense of such contests. Dozens of family boilo recipes are judged and a series of voting parameters and rounds of taste-testing decide the winner.

Commercial Products
 In 2016 Jabberwocky Candles of Frackville, PA released a Boilo Scented Candle.
 As of December 2012 Brokey’s LLC of Ringtown Pennsylvania introduced an "instant" version of the drink that is available commercially.
 Spring Gate Vineyard and Brewery introduced a commercial version in 2020 that was based on the owner's coal region family recipe.

References

Mixed drinks
Christmas food
https://www.pottsmerc.com/2012/12/21/budding-boilo-baron-peddles-pa-coal-region-cocktail/amp/